Irma Salas Silva (11 March 1903 – 28 April 1987) was a distinguished Chilean educator. She was the first Chilean woman to earn a doctorate in education, obtained at Columbia University in 1930.

Biography
Irma Salas was born in Santiago on 11 March 1903, the daughter of educator  and Luisa Silva Molina. She followed in her father's footsteps, becoming a noted academic administrator. She was also an advocate for women's rights and education.

She died on 28 April 1987.

Teaching career
In 1927 she was sent by the government to complete her studies in the United States, where she received her doctorate in education from Columbia University in 1930. She was the first Chilean woman to earn this degree. Her thesis was titled The socionomic composition of the high school population in Chile.

When she returned home, she joined the faculty of the Pedagogical Institute. There she implemented the educational principles of John Dewey.

After leaving the school in 1945, she was appointed president of the commission for the renovation of the secondary school system, in charge of reformulating and rethinking Chilean secondary education. The commission proposed the creation of more experimental lyceums, beginning with six, then extending the reform to the rest. In 1953 President Carlos Ibáñez del Campo put a stop to the reform, so it was limited to the first seven schools. However, some elements of this reform, such as course councils, student centers, and chief teachers, were adopted by the Chilean secondary school system.

In 1946 Salas assumed leadership of the Department of Education of the University of Chile's Faculty of Philosophy and Education.

One of her professional goals was the expansion of the university to the regions of Chile. In 1960, under rector Juan Gómez Millas, Irma Salas implemented a program of university colleges, within the University of Chile, that offered short courses of study, in Temuco, La Serena, Osorno, Antofagasta, and other cities. In 1981 these would become public autonomous universities.

Work for women's rights
In 1931, just after the fall of Carlos Ibáñez del Campo, Salas participated in the creation of the Association of University Women, within which she served as secretary of the first board of directors. The organization, which sought to extend and improve the cultural, economic, civic, and social opportunities of professional women and raise the living conditions of women in general, was driven mainly by Amanda Labarca, with Ernestina Pérez as president and Labarca and lawyer Elena Caffarena as vice-presidents.

In her speech she stated that "women had participated actively in the war effort, which had given them a new self-awareness and respect," and that they had learned "to convert the principles of democracy into reality for women".

Honors
In 1953 Salas was appointed a UNESCO permanent specialist in education. In 1983 she received the Andrés Bello Inter-American Prize for Education, presented by the Organization of American States. The jury recognized 

The University of Chile awarded her the title of doctor honoris causa in 1981.

An elementary school, Escuela Irma Salas Silva, was named in her honor in Concón.

References

1903 births
1987 deaths
20th-century Chilean educators
Chilean women's rights activists
People from Santiago
Teachers College, Columbia University alumni
University of Chile alumni
Academic staff of the University of Chile
Women academic administrators
20th-century women educators